Dolnja Bitnja (in older sources Bitinje) is a small settlement northwest of Ilirska Bistrica in the Inner Carniola region of Slovenia.

References

External links

Dolnja Bitnja on Geopedia

Populated places in the Municipality of Ilirska Bistrica